Laadi is a village in Häädemeeste Parish, Pärnu County, in southwestern Estonia.

References

 

Villages in Pärnu County